Rasmus Holmen (born January 4, 1993) is a Swedish ice hockey player. He is currently playing with IF Vallentuna BK of the Swedish Hockeyettan.

He made his Elitserien debut playing with AIK IF during the 2012–13 Elitserien season.

References

External links

1993 births
Living people
Swedish ice hockey forwards
AIK IF players